Souhaib Kalala (born January 1, 1991) is a Syrian swimmer, who specialized in backstroke events. He represented his nation Syria at the 2008 Summer Olympics, rounding out the field of 45 swimmers in the men's 100 m backstroke.

Kalala was invited by FINA to compete for Syria in the men's 100 m backstroke at the 2008 Summer Olympics in Beijing. Swimming on the outside in heat one, Kalala maintained his pace from start to finish to deny Bangladeshi swimmer Rubel Rana a fourth spot in his lifetime best of 1:00.24. Kalala failed to advance to the semifinals, as he sealed the penultimate position from a roster of forty-five swimmers in the prelims.

References

External links
NBC 2008 Olympics profile

1991 births
Living people
Syrian male swimmers
Olympic swimmers of Syria
Swimmers at the 2008 Summer Olympics
Male backstroke swimmers
Sportspeople from Damascus
21st-century Syrian people